Colopterus is a genus of sap-feeding beetles in the family Nitidulidae. There are about 10 described species in Colopterus.

Species
 Colopterus floridanus Parry and Howden, 1976
 Colopterus gerhardi Dodge, 1939
 Colopterus maculatus (Erichson, 1843)
 Colopterus morio (Erichson, 1843)
 Colopterus niger
 Colopterus posticus (Erichson, 1889)
 Colopterus semitectus (Say, 1825)
 Colopterus testaceus Gillogly, 1969
 Colopterus truncatus (Randall, 1838)
 Colopterus unicolor (Say, 1825)

References

 Habeck, Dale H. / Arnett, Ross H. Jr., Michael C. Thomas, Paul E. Skelley, and J. H. Frank, eds. (2002). "Family 77. Nitidulidae Latreille 1802". American Beetles, vol. 2: Polyphaga: Scarabaeoidea through Curculionoidea, 311–315.
 Parsons, Carl T. (1943). "A revision of Nearctic Nitidulidae (Coleoptera)". Bulletin of the Museum of Comparative Zoology, vol. 92, no. 3, 121–278.

Further reading

 Arnett, R. H. Jr., M. C. Thomas, P. E. Skelley and J. H. Frank. (eds.). (21 June 2002). American Beetles, Volume II: Polyphaga: Scarabaeoidea through Curculionoidea. CRC Press LLC, Boca Raton, Florida .
 
 Richard E. White. (1983). Peterson Field Guides: Beetles. Houghton Mifflin Company.

External links

 NCBI Taxonomy Browser, Colopterus

Nitidulidae